"On Top of the World" is a song by the American rock band Imagine Dragons first appearing on their major-label debut extended play Continued Silence (2012). The song also appears on their first full-length album Night Visions (2012). "On Top of the World" was released digitally as a single on March 18, 2013.

Composition

"On Top of the World" primarily features Magne guitar and piano instrumentation, with vocals performed by lead singer Dan Reynolds. Originally published in the key of C major, the song itself expresses a celebration of accomplishment for the band after striving for years to become successful. The song incorporates the chord progression of C-F-C-Dm in the verses, and F-C-G-Dm in the chorus and bridge, with the pre-chorus using Am and G to create a different break in the song. The song "On Top of the World" is found to be a positive, upbeat track, unlike other songs found on Night Visions, including "Bleeding Out" and "Hear Me".

The song is built on a sample of minimalist composer Steve Reich's "Clapping Music" from 1972.

In media 
Imagine Dragons performed the song live on the Australian version of  The X Factor in 2013.

"On Top of the World" was licensed for inclusion on the soundtrack of EA Sports game, FIFA 13. The band, longtime fans of the FIFA video game series, reacted positively to its inclusion in the game and stated that it would be "a lot of fun hearing the track play while we are doing bicycle kicks and screaming at the screen." It also served as the opening theme of the short-lived CBS comedy series Partners. "On Top of the World" was performed by the PS22 Chorus during Barack Obama's second United States presidential inauguration. It also featured in Konami video game Pro Evolution Soccer 2013 as well as being used in a Samsung Galaxy Note 8.0 advert.

The song was featured prominently in the film The Incredible Burt Wonderstone several times.

The song was featured in the British kids film All Stars.

The song is featured in the Liv and Maddie episode "Twin-a-Rooney", performed by Dove Cameron in the title role of Liv Rooney.  Dove Cameron's version appears on the compilation album Disney Channel Play It Loud.

Hunter Hayes covered the song live on his US tour.

The song was used by ESPN for their coverage of the NBA for the 2013–14 NBA season.

The song was used during Cartoon Network's 2013 Hall of Game Awards.

The song was used in trailers for the films The Croods (2013) and Island of Lemurs: Madagascar (2014).

WPVI-TV in Philadelphia, Pennsylvania uses the song to promote their morning news, Action News Mornings.

The song is used in the Coca-Cola promotional video "Moments of Happiness", shown exclusively at the World of Coca-Cola in Atlanta, Georgia.

The song was featured in the soundtracks of Alpha and Omega 4: The Legend of the Saw Tooth Cave and The Angry Birds Movie.

From 2013 to 2015, Vodafone Portugal and Vodafone Greece used the song in their ads for the Red phone plan.

In November 2017, Ford used this song in their Black Friday year-end event sales commercial.

Music video

As a part of the Palladia documentary Imagine Dragons: The Making of Night Visions, which originally aired on 7 November 2012, the band filmed a video of themselves performing "On Top of the World" and subsequently uploaded it to YouTube.

On 13 November 2013 the band released an official music video for the song. The video satirizes a popular conspiracy theory that the 1969 Moon landings were faked, the footage having been directed by Stanley Kubrick, and that Kubrick then made references to the fakery in various of his subsequent films. In the video, a rock band similar to the Beatles (played by the members of Imagine Dragons) pretend to be astronauts for the faked moon landing. The taping goes awry as fans of the band stream into the sound stage and turn the event into a rock concert, much to the chagrin of Kubrick and President Richard Nixon, who is also on hand; though no one else watching, either in the studio or at home, seems concerned about the revelation of fakery, instead enjoying the music. The video also briefly references another popular conspiracy theory from around the same time, that Beatles member Paul McCartney died in 1966 and was replaced by a look-alike.

The video was filmed in Provo, Utah, Imagine Dragons' original hometown, and includes cameos from various celebrities associated with Provo or Brigham Young University, including Jon Heder, Whit Hertford, the cast of Studio C, Robbie Connolly, and The New Electric Sound. Aja Volkman, Imagine Dragons frontman Dan Reynolds' wife, appears as Reynolds' character's wife. The video was co-directed by Matt Eastin and Corey Fox.

A bunch of easter eggs found in the music video are:

• SNOGARD which is seen in the store is DRAGONS backwards.

• The kid and his Big Wheel represent Danny from The Shining. His SNOGARD shirt is inspired by Danny's Apollo 11 sweater in The Shining.

• The name of the TV store written on the window is "Stan & Brick Appliances" (Stanley Kubrick)

• The brand/model of the TV is Monolith ("2001: A Space Odyssey" reference, another Kubrick Movie of the 1960s)

• The wall hanging behind Dan’s family is the carpet pattern from The Shining.

• Dan's wardrobe and hair look inspired by Steve McQueen's character in the 1968/69 movie Bullitt. Dan is Driving a 1968 Mustang GT Fastback, same model as Steve McQueen in Bullitt.

• The number on Dan's house is 2001 from Kubrick's movie "2001: A Space Odyssey".

• Upper left corner of Dan's house reads Renting Morals which is an anagram for Neil Armstrong.

• Wayne's scene is a representation of Woodstock and the hippie culture of 1969.

• Written on the bus is Strange Love, a reference to Kubrick's film "Dr. Strangelove".

• Written on the bus is "Nu Blizzard" an anagram for Buzz Aldrin.

• The painting on the easel is a wooded area with lake and yellow bug, inspired by opening shot of The Shining.

• There is a small ax in one of the stumps, another reference from The Shining.

• Wayne's jacket has multiple triangle patches (Kubrick, Masonic, Illuminati symbolism).

• Wayne drives a yellow VW bug, same car as in The Shining.

• Wayne's car has a window sticker that reads "Ragged Insomnia", an anagram for Imagine Dragons.

• There is a teepee which is a triangle and also represents the abundance of Native American imagery in The Shining.

• Ben’s character represents the “Paul is Dead” conspiracy theory about The Beatles.

• Ben has the Beatles "Mop Top" hair style and inspired British wardrobe.

• He steps in front of a picture of Paul McCartney in an astronaut uniform with a decorative gun pointed at his head.

• When Ben steps in front of the picture he now has the gun pointed at his head and is surrounded by symbols of death.

• Along with various 1960s artwork the wall contains: 
— Framed Beetles - the actual bugs,  various Jesus images representing death and resurrection (Paul is Dead)     
— Eagle picture and plaque, a symbol for Apollo 11 "The Eagle" and Illuminati symbol.      
— Various masonic plaques and wall hangings     
— Triangle painting with star symbol (All Seeing Eye, Illuminati)     
— Buddha and Devil masks (Represents the battle between good and evil)     
— Beethoven busts (Reference from A Clockwork Orange)     
— Calumet Baking Powder on shelf (Shining Reference)       
— Typewriter on shelf (Shining Reference)     
— Sculpture of man losing his mind on shelf (Shining Reference)      
— Selection of 1960s children's science books with astronaut and space references     
— Leather mask hanging on shelf ("Eyes Wide Shut" Kubrick movie reference)      
— Black bowler hat on umbrella ("A Clockwork Orange" reference)       
— Black and White checkered floor ("A Clockwork Orange reference")      
— Milk on table in Mushroom glasses ("A Clockwork Orange" reference)      
— Ball and toy cars on table ("The Shining" reference)     
— Life Magazine on table features John Glenn on cover.

• Twin boys represent the twin girls from The Shining with nods to The Beatles and Danny from The Shining with their haircuts.

• Ben drives a British car (Beatles).

• Platzman looks like Peter Fonda's character in the 1969 movie "Easy Rider".

• Platzman wears the trademark "Captain America" helmet and jacket and rides a 1960s era.

• Chopper Platzman passes two road signs that say Route 237 and Scenic Overlook. Represent Room 237 and The Overlook Hotel in "The Shining".

• The crosswalk scene looks just like the Beatles Abbey Road album cover and another nod to the "Paul is Dead" conspiracy theory. Ben is walking in Paul McCartney's spot and has no shoes on. The license plate on Ben's car changes from the normal number to "Ben is Dead" between Dan and Platzman. The license plate on the yellow bug reads "Lolita" when turned upside down, another Kubrick movie.

• The military Jeep that drives by is a nod to "Full Metal Jacket" a Kubrick movie. The Jeep has writing over the front wheel that reads Organism Gained, another Imagine Dragons anagram.

• Security camera has a pulsing red light and reads 0009LAH (representing Hal 9000 the computer in "2001: A Space Odyssey").

• Sign on door reads Restricted Area with another triangle. Security camera time code reads 07/20/1969 for a few frames, which is the date of the moon landing.

• Security time code starts with Luna (Spanish for Moon).

• While Aja watches TV, there is a black triangle (Pyramid) candle on the TV (Monolith/Illuminati).

• When the song stops, Dan says "One FALSE step for man, one giant DECEIT for mankind".

• TV flickers showing SNOGARD logo. One frame of the SNOGARD logo actually says REDRUM instead.

• Stanley Kubrick and Richard Nixon are both represented on set.

• Camera that pulls back has 1002 on it (2001 backwards).

• The Native American test pattern on the TV has KDK12 written on it (The radio call letters for The Overlook Hotel in "The Shining")

• Eagle on Guitar (Apollo 11/ Illuminati), Ben playing Paul McCartney style bass.

• When girls run through security camera the time code reads 23,8900 for a few frames (Miles from earth to the moon).

• In the upper left corner of Dan's house, it says 'Renting Morals' which is an anagram for Neil Armstrong. Sadly YouTube's compression killed that one. It's pretty impossible to read.      

• Corey Fox (Co-director) is the painter in the bus scene. Matt Eastin (Director) is sitting on the hood of the bus, and Mac Reynolds (Dan's brother / band manager) is seated near a window.     

• On the clapper board that appears at 2:15, the director's initials are S.K. for Stanley Kubrick.     

• The Paul McCartney astronaut pic can also be seen in the 'Whatever it Takes' video, as well as the "Scenic Overlook" sign.      

• Dan really wanted a monkey in the video, but we shot in Utah. It's illegal to own a monkey in Utah so we had to shoot that scene in LA, a few days later. John Heder, from Napoleon Dynamite, is the cosmonaut with the monkey on his shoulder. The monkey is the same one from the TV show 'Friends' and the movie "Outbreak'.

• Matt Eastin (Director) hid his kids' names on the bus.

Track listing

Commercial performance
The song peaked at 79 on the US Billboard Hot 100 and 10 on the Hot Rock Songs charts.  It has also charted in the top ten in Australia (No. 10), Austria (No. 6), Netherlands (No. 10), New Zealand (No. 10), Poland (No. 7), and Portugal (No. 1). Despite having not yet been released to mainstream radio, it has received airplay on contemporary hit stations, such as 97.1 ZHT in Salt Lake City.

The song reached a million copies sold in the U.S. in April 2014.  It is the fourth million seller from the Night Visions album.

Personnel
Adapted from Night Visions liner notes.

Imagine Dragons
Dan Reynolds – lead vocals
Wayne Sermon – guitar, backing vocals
Ben McKee – bass, backing vocals
Daniel Platzman – drums

Additional musicians
J Browz – guitar

Additional personnel
Alexander Grant – co-writer, producer
Charlie Stavish – recording
Josh Mosser – engineering
Manny Marroquin – mixing
Joe LaPorta – mastering

Charts

Weekly charts

Year-end charts

Certifications

Accolades

Release history

#MakeTheFuture Version
In November 2017, petroleum company Shell created a music video of "On Top of the World" as part of their "Make The Future" campaign to promote environment-friendly energy. The featured artists were Jennifer Hudson, Pixie Lott, Luan Santana, Yemi Alade, and Monali Thakur. Another #MakeTheFuture music video also featured American Authors' 2014 hit single Best Day of My Life.

References

2012 songs
2013 singles
Cultural depictions of Richard Nixon
Cultural depictions of Stanley Kubrick
Imagine Dragons songs
Song recordings produced by Alex da Kid
Songs written by Wayne Sermon
Songs written by Dan Reynolds (musician)
Songs written by Daniel Platzman
Songs written by Ben McKee
Songs written by Alex da Kid
Kidinakorner singles
Interscope Records singles
American folk rock songs